Güneysınır is a town and district of Konya Province in the Central Anatolia region of Turkey. Karasınır and Güneybağ form the major neighbourhoods of the district. According to 2000 census, population of the district is 24,301 of which 10,217 live in the town of Güneysınır.

Notes

References

External links
 District governor's official website 
 District municipality's official website 

Populated places in Konya Province
Districts of Konya Province
Lycaonia